The AFC U-20 Asian Cup, formerly known as the AFC Youth Championship and AFC U-19 Championship, is a biennial international association football competition organised by the Asian Football Confederation (AFC) for the men's under-20 national teams of Asia. The competition has been held since 1959. Between 1959 and 1978, the tournament was held annually (without qualification); since 1980, it has been held every two years. The 1980 AFC Youth Championship had a qualification stage for first time.

The tournament has been played in a number of different formats during its existence. Currently, it consists of two stages, similar to the AFC's other Asian Championship competitions. The qualifying stage is open to all AFC members and the final stage is contested between 16 teams. The most recent edition, the 40th, was held in Indonesia. The AFC have proposed switching the tournament from under-19 to under-20 starting from 2023. Moreover, the tournament will also be rebranded from the "AFC U-19 Championship" to the "AFC U-20 Asian Cup".

Format

History

Results

Coordinate is based on the capital of the country.

Notes
1 Title shared.
2 Third place shared.
3 Final tournaments in round-robin format.
4 No third place match played since 2008; losing semi-finalists are listed in alphabetical order.

Successful national teams

Notes:
 Bold Italic indicates hosts for that year.
 Total (40 editions): 9 editions shared champions, 5 editions shared third place, and 6 editions with no third place match.

Medal summary

Records and statistics

Awards

Participating nations
Legend:
 – Champions
 – Runners-up
 – Third place
 – Fourth place
 – Semi-finalists
QF – Quarter-finals
GS – Group stage
q – Qualified for upcoming tournament
DQ – Disqualified
 ••  – Qualified but withdrew
 •  – Did not qualify
 ×  – Did not enter
 ×  – Withdrew / Banned / Entry not accepted by FIFA
 — Country not affiliated to AFC at that time
 — Country did not exist or national team was inactive
     – Hosts
     – Not affiliated to FIFA

Summary (1959-2023)

1 No longer an AFC member. 
2 Represented South Vietnam from 1959 to 1974. 
3 Representing South Yemen in 1975 and North Yemen in 1978.

4 Not an AFC member: participated in tournament as part of intercontinental play-off to qualify for the 1993 FIFA World Youth Championship.

FIFA U-20 World Cup performances
Legend
1st – Champions
2nd – Runners-up
3rd – Third place
4th – Fourth place
QF – Quarterfinals
R2 – Round 2
R1 – Round 1
     – Hosts
     – Not affiliated to AFC
q – Qualified for upcoming tournament

See also 
AFC U-20 Women's Asian Cup
FIFA U-20 World Cup
AFC U-17 Asian Cup
AFC U-23 Asian Cup

References

External links
 Official page
 RSSSF Page on AFC Youth Championship

 
Under-19 association football competitions
Under-20 association football
Asian Football Confederation competitions for national teams
Recurring sporting events established in 1959
1959 establishments in Asia